Barneveld Centrum is a railway station located in Barneveld, Netherlands. The station was opened on 1 May 1902 and is located on the Valleilijn. The station closed on 7 September 1944 and re-opened 20 May 1951. The station is currently operated by Connexxion, previously operated by Nederlandse Spoorwegen.

Train service
, the following local train services call at this station:

Stoptrein: Amersfoort - Barneveld - Ede-Wageningen
Stoptrein: Amersfoort - Barneveld

Bus services
 87 (Barneveld Centrum - Driedorp - Nijkerk) - Syntus, every hour
 105 (Arnhem - Otterlo - Harskamp - Barneveld Centrum) - Syntus, twice an hour
 205 (Barneveld Centrum - Voorthuizen - Putten - Ermelo - Harderwijk) - Syntus, twice to 4x per hour
 509 (Barneveld Centrum - Achterveld - Leusden - Hoevelaken - Nijkerk) - Syntus Buurtbus, every hour
 511 (Barneveld Centrum - Scherpenzeel) - Syntus Buurtbus, every hour

References

External links

NS website 
Dutch Public Transport journey planner 

Centrum
Railway stations opened in 1902
Railway stations closed in 1944
Railway stations opened in 1951
Railway stations on the Valleilijn
1902 establishments in the Netherlands
Railway stations in the Netherlands opened in the 20th century